Hans Ruckstuhl (born 26 January 1943 in Lucerne, died 1987 in Porto Heli) was a Swiss rower. He competed at the 1968 Summer Olympics, 1972 Summer Olympics and the 1976 Summer Olympics.

References

1943 births
Living people
Swiss male rowers
Olympic rowers of Switzerland
Rowers at the 1968 Summer Olympics
Rowers at the 1972 Summer Olympics
Rowers at the 1976 Summer Olympics
Place of birth missing (living people)